The solitary cacique or solitary black cacique (Cacicus solitarius) is a species of bird in the family Icteridae.

It is found in Argentina, Bolivia, Brazil, Colombia, Ecuador, Paraguay, Peru, Uruguay, and Venezuela. Its natural habitats are subtropical or tropical moist lowland forests, subtropical or tropical swamps, and heavily degraded former forest. It is a fairly common bird with a very extensive range so the IUCN has rated it as a "species of least concern".

Description
It differs from all other entirely black birds with dark irises within its range, by having a large white, chisel-shaped, sharply-pointed beak. It could be confused with the Ecuadorian cacique (Cacicus sclateri), but that is smaller and has a restricted range, or the yellow-billed cacique (Amblycercus holosericeus), but that is not found east of the Andes. It has a range of different vocalizations which are mostly delivered at a measured pace but are sometimes interrupted by gurgles and growls.

Distribution and habitat
The solitary cacique has a very wide distribution in Amazonia. It inhabits forests, gallery forests and flooded areas. It is generally found in the mid-storey of the canopy, or the shrubby understorey, often clambering about among dense vines.

Ecology
The solitary cacique is often found singly or in pairs but does not join flocks of birds. It forages in tangled undergrowth and is acrobatic, sometimes hanging upside-down. At times it visits flowering trees higher in the canopy. Its diet consists of invertebrates and small vertebrates such as tree frogs, and it also consumes fruit and nectar. Breeding takes place between October to January according to location and in Argentina it is thought that two broods are reared. Many birds in this genus build their nests in colonies, but this bird nests alone.

Status
It is a fairly common species, and although the population trend has not been quantified, the population is thought to be stable, so the International Union for Conservation of Nature has assessed the bird's conservation status as being of "least concern".

References

solitary cacique
Birds of South America
Birds of the Pantanal
solitary cacique
Birds of the Amazon Basin
Birds of Brazil
Taxa named by Louis Jean Pierre Vieillot
Taxonomy articles created by Polbot